The 2016 Giro d'Italia began on 6 May, and stage 21 occurred on 29 May.

Stage 12
19 May 2016 — Noale to Bibione,

Stage 13
20 May 2016 — Palmanova to Cividale del Friuli,

Stage 14
21 May 2016 — Alpago (Farra) to Corvara (Alta Badia),

Stage 15
22 May 2016 — Castelrotto/Kastelruth to Alpe di Siusi/Seiser Alm,  Individual time trial

Stage 16
24 May 2016 — Bressanone/Brixen to Andalo,

Stage 17
25 May 2016 — Molveno to Cassano d'Adda,

Stage 18
26 May 2016 — Muggiò to Pinerolo,

Stage 19
27 May 2016 — Pinerolo to Risoul (France),

Stage 20
28 May 2016 — Guillestre (France) to Sant'Anna di Vinadio,

Stage 21
29 May 2016 — Cuneo to Torino,

References

2016 Giro d'Italia
Giro d'Italia stages